Khoronkhoy is a rural locality (a settlement) in Kyakhtinsky District, Republic of Buryatia, Russia. The population was 2,041 as of 2010. There are 32 streets.

Geography 
Khoronkhoy is located 35 km northwest of Kyakhta (the district's administrative centre) by road. Ust-Kyakhta is the nearest rural locality.

References 

Rural localities in Kyakhtinsky District